The SGB Premiership Knockout Cup is a speedway Knockout Cup competition in the United Kingdom for tier one teams. In 2019, the KO Cup was branded as the SGB Supporters Cup.

The event was not held in 2020, 2021 or 2022.

History
It was renamed the SGB Premiership Knockout Cup in 2017, after formerly being called the Elite League Knockout Cup until 2012 and it was not held from 2013 to 2016.

Winners

See also
 Knockout Cup (speedway) for full list of winners and competitions

References

Speedway competitions in the United Kingdom
Recurring sporting events established in 2017
2017 establishments in the United Kingdom